Hilda is the fourth studio album by Australian singer Jessica Mauboy, released on 18 October 2019 by Sony Music Australia. For the first time, Mauboy co-wrote every track on the album. The album is named after Mauboy's middle name.

About the new album Mauboy said, "This record is a dedication to those women, to my grandmother and mother for being fierce and strong and how they have helped me to pursue this life and become a woman."

The album was nominated for Album of the Year at the 2020 National Indigenous Music Awards.

The album was nominated for ARIA Award for Album of the Year at the ARIA Music Awards of 2020.

Reception

 
David from auspOp said "This album is an epic piece of storytelling that focuses on Jess's history and how it's shaped who she's become. While she has played a part in song writing across previous albums, she's never been quite so raw, honest and believable in her messages. This openness is what makes this album truly sing… They tug at your heartstrings and create such a strong connection, it's hard not to fall in love with each of them."
 
Jeff Jenkins from Stack Magazine said "Hilda is a sassy collection that swings between urban, pop and ballads. And with such a potent voice, Mauboy is capable of making it all work. It's a mystery why she hasn't had more international success. "

Singles
"Sunday" was released as the lead single from Hilda on 12 April 2019. The official video was released on 30 April 2019.

The second single "Little Things" was released on 21 June 2019 and has peaked at number 25 on the ARIA Singles Chart.
 
The third single "Selfish" was released on 18 October 2019. The lyric video was uploaded a day before with the official music video released on 18 December 2019.

"Butterfly" was sent to radio on 14 August 2020 as the album's fourth single. An acoustic version was released digitally the same day.

Promotional singles 
"Blessing" was released as the album's first promotional single in July 2019. "Just Like You" was released as the album's second promotional single on 2 August 2019. "Jealous" was released as the album's third and final promotional single in October 2019.

Track listing

Charts

Year-end charts

See also
 List of number-one albums of 2019 (Australia)

Release history

References

2019 albums
Jessica Mauboy albums
Sony Music Australia albums
Albums produced by Oak Felder